Vlado Gorišek, known as Lado Gorišek (4 January 1925 – 14 June 1997), was a Slovenian civil engineer, constructor, and architect.

Career
His works were mainly constructions of ski jumping and ski flying hills worldwide. His best-known work is the Gorišek Brothers Ski Flying Hill (Letalnica bratov Gorišek) in Planica, Slovenia, which is currently the world's second-largest ski flying hill. He oversaw its construction together with his brother Janez Gorišek.

References

1925 births
1997 deaths
Architects from Ljubljana
Engineers from Ljubljana
Yugoslav engineers